Trouville (also known as Trouville-Alliquerville) is a commune  in the Seine-Maritime department in the Normandy region in northern France.

Geography

Heraldry

Population

Places of interest
 The church of St. Pierre, dating from the sixteenth century.
 A fifteenth-century manorhouse
 The church of Notre-Dame, dating from the thirteenth century
 A seventeenth-century stone cross in the cemetery.

See also
Communes of the Seine-Maritime department

References

External links

 Official town website 

Communes of Seine-Maritime